Let's Eat may refer to:

 Let's Eat (TV series), a 2013 South Korean television series
 Let's Eat 2, a 2015 South Korean television series
 Let's Eat 3, a 2018 South Korean television series
 Let's Eat (album), a 2010 album by The Wiggles
 Let's Eat, a 1999 album by Love/Hate
 Let's Eat, a 2004 album by Sanctum
 Let's Eat! (film), a 2016 Singaporean-Malaysian comedy film
 "Let's Eat!", an episode of Barney & Friends